Terre-Natale (homeland) is a former commune in the Haute-Marne department in north-eastern France. It was formed in 1972 by merging the communes Champigny-sous-Varennes, Chézeaux and Varennes-sur-Amance. Champigny-sous-Varennes became independent in 1986, and the commune was disbanded in 2012. Its population was 383 in 2009.

See also
Communes of the Haute-Marne department

References

Terrenatale